The 1931–32 season was the 32nd season of competitive football in Belgium. The second and third level of Belgian football were just changed prior to the beginning of the season, with now 2 leagues of 14 clubs in Division I and 4 leagues of 14 clubs in Promotion. R Liersche SK won their first Premier Division title.

Overview
At the end of the season, Tubantia FAC and FC Turnhout were relegated to the Division I, while Lyra TSV (Division I A winner) and RRC de Bruxelles (Division I B winner) were promoted to the Premier Division. The Promotion was won by SV Blankenberghe, Oude God Sport, Union Hutoise FC and Stade Waremmien. The four clubs were promoted to the Division I while Sint-Niklaassche SK, SK Roulers, RFC Bressoux and R Charleroi SC were relegated from the Division I to the Promotion.

National team

* Belgium score given first

Key
 H = Home match
 A = Away match
 N = On neutral ground
 F = Friendly
 o.g. = own goal

Honours

Final league tables

Premier Division

References
RSSSF archive – Final tables 1895–2002
Belgian clubs history
FA website